The Onaç spring minnow (Pseudophoxinus ninae) is a species of cyprinid fish.
It is found in the Onaç drainage in Anatolia in Turkey.

References

Pseudophoxinus
Endemic fauna of Turkey
Fish described in 2006